Good for Nothing may refer to:

 Good for Nothing (2012 film), New Zealand film
 Good for Nothing (2014 film), Italian film
 Good-for-Nothing, 1922 German film
 Good for Nothing (song), 2011 single by Hard-Fi
 Good for Nothing, 2001 song by Every Little Thing
 His New Profession, or The Good for Nothing, a 1914 American film starring Charlie Chaplin
 The Good for Nothing (1917 film), an American silent drama film

See also
 Memoirs of a Good-for-Nothing, 1866 translation of Eichendorff's novella Aus dem Leben eines Taugenichts